Stripped is a Danish reality-documentary television franchise first broadcast in Denmark in 2015, and later international versions were made. The show features participants who lose all of their possessions (including clothing) and stored in a shipping container metres away from their household. They must get one item each day from the container from a range between ten and thirty days.

As of 13 September 2020, there have been ten versions of Stripped in ten countries.

Versions

References

External links 
 Naken at SVT Play
 Riisutut at MTV
 Nacktes Überleben at Sat.1
 Stripped at Bravo
 	El Contenedor at Antena 3
 Experiment 21 at Prima Cool

2010s Danish television series
2015 Danish television series debuts
Endemol Shine Group franchises
Television franchises
Reality television series franchises
Documentary television series
DR TV original programming
Channel 4 documentaries
Channel 4 reality television shows
Sveriges Television original programming
Sat.1 original programming
Bravo (American TV network) original programming
Televisão Independente original programming
Antena 3 (Spanish TV channel) network series
Nudity in television